Lishu or Li Shu may refer to:

 Li Shu (Tang dynasty) (740-791), a Tang dynasty prince
 Lishu County, in Jilin, China
 Lishu District, in Jixi, Heilongjiang, China
 Lishu station, Suzhou Rail Transit, China
 Clerical script or lishu, a style of Chinese calligraphy

See also
 Li Su (disambiguation)